Chalcot House is a Grade II* listed country house to the south of the village of Dilton Marsh, near Westbury, Wiltshire, England, standing in Chalcot Park.

History
The house was built in the early 18th century on the site of an older house, extensively altered in 1872 by James Piers St Aubyn, and restored in the 1970s. The three-storey house, in Flemish bond brickwork with stone dressings, has a five-bay front with pilasters flanking the ground-floor windows.

In the later nineteenth century the house was owned by Charles Paul Phipps (1815–1880), merchant in Brazil and later Conservative MP for Westbury (1869–1874) and High Sheriff of Wiltshire (1875). Some papers relating to the Phipps family are held by the Wiltshire and Swindon History Centre.

In the later twentieth century the house was owned by the stockbroker Tony Rudd.

Alterations were made in the twentieth century by the architect Theo Crosby. A hoard of Romano-British coins was found in the grounds near the house in 1973. An auction of contents was held at the house by Sotheby's in 1989.

References 

Georgian architecture in Wiltshire
Grade II* listed houses
Grade II* listed buildings in Wiltshire
Country houses in Wiltshire